People and dogs (El nas we El Kelab) is a collection of short stories written by the Egyptian physician Moawad GadElrab (15 September 1929 – 23 August 1983) and published by The National Publishing and Printing house in Cairo, Egypt 1964.

Stories

 The Demon
 Another woman
 Because my brother
 Do not speed up the pace
 Witness on the Nile 
 The rest of life
 It's also For me
 In hand of God 
 Flesh of a friend
 Sakka's daughter
 The cup
 I'll be back tomorrow 
 People and dogs
 Images from the past

See also
List of Egyptian writers
Moawad GadElrab

References

1964 short story collections
20th-century Arabic books
Egyptian books